Aubrey Peak, also known as Grooms Peak, is a summit located 35 miles east-northeast of Lake Havasu City in Mohave County, Arizona and is in the Hualapai Mountains.

The peak can approached from the town of Wikieup on U.S. Route 93 by way of Chicken Springs Road which ascends to a saddle on the mountains southeast flank.

The Aubrey Peak is profiled in Hiking Arizona's Geology, as Hike 29, Aubrey Peak Road.

References

Landforms of Mohave County, Arizona
Mountains of Mohave County, Arizona